The Allahabad Metro, officially known as Prayagraj Metro, is a proposed Light rail system for the city of Allahabad (Prayagraj), Uttar Pradesh, India. The proposed system will consist of two lines, an east-west line from Manauri to Trivenipuram, and a north-south line from Shantipuram in Jalalapur to Karchana. There will be a total of 39 stations, 20 on the east-west line and 19 on the north-south line. The project is expected to cost 8000 crore.

Status updates
 Feb 2021: Central government rejected proposal of Allahabad Metro due to low population area. 
 Feb 2019: UP government has allocated ₹ 175 Cr to start preliminary work in budget
 Mar 2019: Detailed Project Report (DPR) provided to state government for approval by Prayagraj Development Authority.
 July 2021: State government approved the light rail metro system for Allahabad city.

References 

Proposed rapid transit in Uttar Pradesh
Transport in Allahabad